Menesia walshae is a species of beetle in the family Cerambycidae. It was described by Stephan von Breuning in 1960. It is known from Java.

References

Menesia
Beetles described in 1960